Tsogbadrakh Mönkhzul (born February 28, 1981, in Ulaanbaatar) is a Mongolian sport shooter.
She won a gold medal in the women's sport pistol at the 2007 ISSF World Cup series in Bangkok, Thailand, accumulating a score of 783.3 points.

Mönkhzul represented Mongolia at the 2008 Summer Olympics in Beijing, where she competed in two pistol shooting events, along with her teammate Otryadyn Gündegmaa. She placed eighth in the women's 10 m air pistol, by nine tenths of a point (0.9) behind Finland's Mira Nevansuu, with a total score of 479.6 targets (387 in the preliminary rounds, and 92.6 in the final). Three days later, Mönkhzul competed for her second event, 25 m pistol, where she was able to shoot 290 targets in the precision stage, and 291 in the rapid fire, for a total score of 581 points, finishing only in twelfth place.

Mönkhzul represented Mongolia at the 2016 Summer Olympics in Rio de Janeiro, she competed in two pistol shooting events again. She competed in the women's 10 m air pistol and the women's 25 m pistol along with Otryadyn Gündegmaa once again. In the 10 m event she finished 32nd of 44 shooters with a total score of 378 targets, she did not advance to the finals. In the 25 m event she finished 11th of 40 shooters with a score of 580 targets, Mönkhzul finished 1 target ahead of Gündegmaa who finished 12th. Mönkhzul was 2 targets off from qualifying for the finals.

References

External links
 
 

Mongolian female sport shooters
Living people
Olympic shooters of Mongolia
Shooters at the 2008 Summer Olympics
Shooters at the 2016 Summer Olympics
Sportspeople from Ulaanbaatar
1981 births
Asian Games medalists in shooting
Shooters at the 1998 Asian Games
Shooters at the 2002 Asian Games
Shooters at the 2006 Asian Games
Shooters at the 2010 Asian Games
Shooters at the 2014 Asian Games
Asian Games silver medalists for Mongolia
Asian Games bronze medalists for Mongolia
Medalists at the 2006 Asian Games
Medalists at the 2010 Asian Games
Medalists at the 2014 Asian Games
Shooters at the 2018 Asian Games
21st-century Mongolian women